Logea Island (also spelled Rogeia) is a large island separating West Channel, East Channel and China Strait, just south of Milne Bay, in Milne Bay Province, Papua New Guinea.

Administration 
The island is split between 2 Wards: Logea South, and Logea North. both belong to Bwanabwana Rural Local Level Government Area LLG, Samarai-Murua District, which are in Milne Bay Province.

Geography 
The island is part of the Logea group, itself a part of Samarai Islands of the Louisiade Archipelago.

Demographics 
The population of 1004 is split between 10 villages along the coast, where Kasabanalua on the north point serves as the center. 
other villages are : Kumikuku, Bwasikauli, Panama Point, Dabali, Logea Pota, Isukopu, Gabui, Boiduhana and Dagedagela.

Economy 
The islanders, like other from Samarai Islands are experts in boat building.
The most of them are farmers as opposed to eastern Louisiade Archipelago islanders. they grow Sago, Taro, and Yams for crops.

Transportation 
There are 2 docks at Kasabanalua and Pota.

References

Islands of Milne Bay Province
Louisiade Archipelago